Miss Liechtenstein is a title awarded by beauty pageants for unmarried women in Liechtenstein. The first pageant was held in 1988. The second was held in 1994. Events in 2007 and 2008 were organized by a local organizing committee, Verein Miss Liechtenstein. In 2007, nine finalists were selected from among applications to compete in the pageant. The following year, eight finalists were selected.

In October 2009, the then-reigning Miss Liechtenstein, Stefanie Kaiser, gave birth to a baby girl.

Titleholders 

The magazine Miss Europe Continental has articles introducing two people with the title 'Miss Liechtenstein': Jasmin Falk and Inessa Sazhneva. It is unclear whether these individuals are official winners of the relevant contest.

Liechtenstein at International pageants

Miss Intercontinental Liechtenstein

References

 

Liechtenstein
Liechtenstein awards